Rishika Mihani (born; 8 June) is an Indian television actress. She made her debut with Raja Ki Aayegi Baraat. She has done episodics for Adaalat, C.I.D., Aahat and Savdhaan India @ 11.

Rishika Mihani has a sister Muskaan Mihani, who is also a television actress.

Career
Rishika Mihani started her career with the role of Ira (Mohini) in Raja Ki Aayegi Baraat on Star Plus, After she played in Beend Banoongaa Ghodi Chadhunga
as Komal, She was last seen in Love Marriage Ya Arranged Marriage as Shivani.

Television

References

External links

1987 births
Living people
Indian television actresses
Indian soap opera actresses